

Seeds
A champion seed is indicated in bold text while text in italics indicates the round in which that seed was eliminated.

  Álbert Costa (champion)
  Alberto Berasategui (final)
  Albert Portas (second round)
  Dominik Hrbatý (semifinals)
  Karim Alami (quarterfinals)
  Galo Blanco (semifinals)
  Julián Alonso (quarterfinals)
  Guillaume Raoux (second round)

Draw

External links
 1997 Marbella Open draw

Singles